Otsego High School is a high school in the village of Tontogany, Ohio, United States. Students are from the general region of Weston, Grand Rapids, Middleton and Washington Townships and the Villages of Weston, Grand Rapids, Tontogany and Haskins.  Though the student body is quite small, there are many open enrollment students.

Facilities
In 2004 the Otsego Local School District entered into a partnership with the Ohio School Facilities Commission. This partnership, as well as a bond issue passed by voters, allowed the district to construct a state-of-the-art high school. Construction of this building was completed on January 3, 2007. As part of the partnership, the district will also be constructing two new elementary schools to replace buildings in Haskins and Weston, Ohio, as well as remodeling the existing elementary building in Grand Rapids, Ohio. Demolition of the former junior high school building, which recently moved to the campus in Tontogany, commenced in early July 2008.
In 2009 the State of Ohio notified the Otsego Board of Education that the district did not have sufficient numbers of elementary students to justify building two schools. Consequently, the Board opted to build a single school in Tontogany in December 2009. Ground breaking for the new school was held in August 2010.

Notable alumni
Edward C. Byers, Jr., Navy SEAL, Medal of Honor recipient

Athletics
Otsego High School is a member of the Northern Buckeye Conference after being charter members of the Suburban Lakes League from 1972–2011.

Suburban Lakes League Championships
 Boys Track & Field – 2000
 Boys Football – 1981, 1985, 1988, 1990, 1992, 1993, 2000, 2005
 Boys Basketball – 2000, 2001
 Boys Baseball – 2006, 2012, 2013
 Girls Volleyball – 2008, 2009

Northern Buckeye Conference Championships 

 Boys Football – 2020
 Boys Cross Country - 2013, 2014, 2015, 2016, 2017, 2019
 Boys Basketball - 2013
 Boys Baseball - 2013
 Girls Cross Country - 2016
 Girls Basketball - 2015, 2017
 Girls Volleyball - 2013, 2014, 2015 (shared with Eastwood)
 Girls Golf - 2012, 2014, 2017, 2018
 Girls Softball - 2021

Sectional champions
 Girls Volleyball – 2008, 2009
 Girls Basketball – 2010
 Boys Basketball – 2013 (NBC Champs)
 Boys Basketball – 2016

District champions
 Girls Volleyball – 2009
 Boys Cross Country - 2014

Ohio High School Athletic Association State Championships

 Girls Volleyball – 1992 
 Boys Basketball – 1951* 
 *Title won by Grand Rapids High School prior to consolidation into Otsego H.S.

References

External links
 District Website

High schools in Wood County, Ohio
Public high schools in Ohio